Thomas de Lisle (–1361) (Latinised to Thomas de Insula ("Thomas from the island") was a medieval Bishop of Ely.

Lisle was elected to Ely on 15 July 1345 and consecrated in July 1345. He had his servants burn down some of the houses belonging to Blanche of Lancaster, a close relative of the King, with whom he had a long-standing quarrel. He was rebuked by Edward III and ordered to pay damages, but after that, he had her servant William Holm murdered in 1355. A court found him guilty of incitement. Edward then confiscated Lisle's possessions and made him beg for forgiveness.
Lisle's Period as bishop coincided with the Edwardian War with France, he released priests to accompany the expeditions, however the taxes and demands on the clergy appear to have coincided with poor harvests, in May 1347 in response to the King's demand for wool, the bishop could only offer six sacks of wool.

Lisle died on 23 June 1361.

Citations

References

Further reading
 Haines, Roy, "Lisle, Thomas (c.1298–1361)", Oxford Dictionary of National Biography, Oxford University Press, 2004

Bishops of Ely
1290s births
1361 deaths

Year of birth uncertain